The Billboard Hot 100 is a chart that ranks the best-performing singles of the United States. Its data, published by Billboard magazine and compiled by Nielsen SoundScan, is based collectively on each single's weekly physical and digital sales, as well as airplay and streaming. At the end of a year, Billboard will publish an annual list of the 100 most successful songs throughout that year on the Hot 100 chart based on the information. For 2017, the list was published on December 11, calculated with data from December 3, 2016 to November 25, 2017.

"Closer" by The Chainsmokers featuring Halsey was listed within the top 10 for the second year in a row, making it only the third song in history to achieve this, after Elton John's "Candle in the Wind 1997" and LeAnn Rimes' "How Do I Live", both of which were ranked in the top ten of the 1997 and 1998 lists.

Ed Sheeran was named the top Hot 100 artist of 2017. He scored the number-one Hot 100 song of the year with "Shape of You", one of two songs he placed on the list.

Year-end list

See also
 2017 in American music
 List of Billboard Hot 100 number-one singles of 2017
 List of Billboard Hot 100 top-ten singles in 2017

References

United States Hot 100 Year-End
Billboard charts
2017 in American music